Desmond Lamont "Desi" Relaford (born September 16, 1973) is an American former professional baseball infielder and current manager of the Danville Otterbots. He played in Major League Baseball for the Texas Rangers, Colorado Rockies, Kansas City Royals, Seattle Mariners, New York Mets, San Diego Padres and Philadelphia Phillies.

Career
Known more for his defense than his bat, his versatility was his trademark. Over the course of an 11-year major league career, he played every position in the field except first base and catcher; he pitched in one game for the New York Mets in which he recorded a perfect inning with a strikeout and threw over 90 mph.

Relaford was traded twice during the 2001-2002 offseason, once with Tsuyoshi Shinjo to the San Francisco Giants for Shawn Estes and again to the Seattle Mariners for David Bell.

Relaford signed a minor league deal with the Rangers on February 14, 2007. He competed with Jerry Hairston Jr., Drew Meyer, and Joaquin Arias for a spot as utility infielder during spring training, but wound up starting the season in the minors. In early July, Relaford was called up to the Rangers after regular second baseman Ian Kinsler was placed on the disabled list after suffering a stress fracture. Relaford was released after the season, and never played professionally after that.

On March 23, 2021, Relaford was named the manager for the Danville Otterbots of the new Appalachian League.

Life beyond baseball 
Relaford currently has a home in Jacksonville, Florida with his wife, Cassandra Sapphire Daley, whom he married in 2002. They have two children. Relaford is the founder of 6 Hole Records, a hip-hop record label based in Jacksonville.

Relaford is a graduate of Sandalwood High School.

Notes

Further reading 
 Boite, Peter (April 18, 2001). "Relaford Relishes Rare Start for Mets". New York Daily News. p. 56
 Boite, Peter (May 18, 2001). "Desi a Relief in Closing Nightmare". New York Daily News. p. 80
 Everson, Darren (June 24, 2001). "Bobbleheads! Mets Fall in 11; Collapse Wastes Desi's HR". New York Daily News. p. 50
 "New York Traffic is the Worst". Asheville Citizen-Times. June 24, 2001. p. 31
 Quinn, T.J. (July 30, 2001). "Mets, Piazza Do as Desi Does; Little Things Set Up Big Blast". New York Daily News. p. 46, 47
 Caldera, Pete (August 23, 2001). "Relaford delivers victory for the Mets". The Bergen Record. p. S-5 
 Gross, Andrew (August 23, 2001). "Relaford Gives Mets Big Boost". The Journal News. p. 46

External links

1973 births
Living people
Philadelphia Phillies players
San Diego Padres players
New York Mets players
Seattle Mariners players
Kansas City Royals players
Colorado Rockies players
Texas Rangers players
African-American baseball players
Baseball players from Georgia (U.S. state)
Major League Baseball infielders
Major League Baseball outfielders
Arizona League Mariners players
Peninsula Pilots players
Jacksonville Suns players
Riverside Pilots players
Port City Roosters players
Tacoma Rainiers players
Scranton/Wilkes-Barre Red Barons players
Clearwater Phillies players
Omaha Royals players
Syracuse SkyChiefs players
Colorado Springs Sky Sox players
Memphis Redbirds players
Oklahoma RedHawks players
21st-century African-American sportspeople
20th-century African-American sportspeople
Sandalwood High School alumni